The Bulgaria national women's handball team is the national team of Bulgaria. It takes part in international team handball competitions. The team's greatest result came in 1984 when they won the Balkan Championship along with achieving the 10th rank at the World Cup. The team participated in the 1982 World Women's Handball Championship in Hungary, placing 10th, and in the 1990 World Women's Handball Championship in South Korea, placing 12th.

World Championship record
1982 – 10th place
1990 – 12th place

References

External links

IHF profile

Handball
Women's national handball teams
National team